Branford is a shoreline town located on Long Island Sound in New Haven County, Connecticut, United States, about  east of downtown New Haven. The population was 28,273 at the 2020 census.

Geography
There are two harbors, the more central Branford Harbor and Stony Creek Harbor on the east end, and one town beach at Branford Point. Much of the town's border with East Haven to the west is dominated by Lake Saltonstall, a reservoir owned by the South Central Connecticut Regional Water Authority, and Saltonstall Mountain, part of the Metacomet Ridge, a mountainous trap rock ridgeline that stretches from Long Island Sound to nearly the Vermont border. The southern terminus of the Metacomet Ridge, Beacon Hill, is located in Branford.

The town of Branford includes the Thimble Islands. Neighboring towns are North Branford to the north, Guilford to the east, and East Haven to the west.

History 
An area called Totoket, which became Branford, was part of the land bought from the Mattabesech Indians in 1638 by the first English settlers of New Haven. Previously, the Dutch in the New Netherland settlements set up a trading post at the mouth of the Branford River in the 17th century, the source of the name "Dutch Wharf", also known as "Dutch House Wharf" and the Dutch House Quarter. The area was also described by Ezra Stiles as containing a "Dutch Fort", as hinted at by archaeological excavations completed in the 1990s.

The town's name is said to be derived from the town of Brentford, England. The town in early maps was called Brentford before being shortened to Branford. Established in 1644, Branford grew during the 18th and 19th centuries. In the late 18th century, the first shoreline community, Stony Creek, was settled. Indian Neck and Pine Orchard were also settled, but neither of those settlements was permanent until the mid-19th century.

In 1852, the railroad helped bring new business, including Branford Lockworks, Malleable Iron Fittings Company, and the Atlantic Wire Company. The Stony Creek granite quarries also rose to prominence as a direct consequence of railroad construction.

During the mid-19th century, Branford became a popular resort area. Approximately twenty hotels opened, including Indian Point House in Stony Creek, Montowese House in Indian Neck, and Sheldon House in Pine Orchard. During the mid-20th century, Branford shed its resort image. It developed with many characteristics typically associated with northeastern suburbs.

In 1974, Connecticut Hospice was founded in Branford, the first hospice in the United States. In 2001, it moved to a beautiful waterfront facility at 100 Double Beach Road, in Branford, where it remains today. https://www.hospice.com/history/

Climate

Landmarks and attractions

Branford has six historic districts that are listed on the United States National Register of Historic Places (NRHP).  These include buildings in Federal, Arts and Crafts, and Queen Anne styles of architecture.  Five NRHP-listed districts are Branford Center Historic District, Branford Point Historic District, Canoe Brook Historic District, Route 146 Historic District, and Stony Creek-Thimble Islands Historic District.

More than 20 historic homes and other properties are separately listed on the National Register.  In total, 30 properties or districts in Branford appear in New Haven County's NRHP listings.  One example is Harrison House and Museum, a 1724 structure, which has period furnishings, local historical items, archives, a barn and an herb garden.

Cruises of the Thimble Islands depart from the Stony Creek dock, and seal-watch cruises take place in March.

Branford is home to two breweries named after local landmarks, Thimble Island Brewing Company and Stony Creek Brewery.

Demographics

As of the census of 2000, there were 28,683 people, 12,543 households, and 7,663 families residing in the town. The racial makeup of the town was 94.05% white, 1.35% African American, 0.10% Native American, 2.72% Asian, 0.06% Pacific Islander, 0.53% from other races, and 1.20% from two or more races. Hispanic or Latino of any race were 2.57% of the population.

There were 12,543 households, out of which 25.7% had children under the age of 18 living with them, 47.9% were married couples living together, 9.8% had a female householder with no husband present, and 38.9% were non-families. 32.4% of all households were made up of individuals, and 11.6% had someone living alone who was 65 years of age or older.  The average household size was 2.26 and the average family size was 2.90.

In the town, the population was spread out, with 20.7% under the age of 18, 5.4% from 18 to 24, 30.5% from 25 to 44, 26.6% from 45 to 64, and 16.9% who were 65 years of age or older.  The median age was 41 years.  For every 100 females, there were 88.9 males.  For every 100 females age 18 and over, there were 85.2 males.

The median income for a household in the town was $58,009, and the median income for a family was $69,510. Males had a median income of $46,927 versus $35,947 for females. The per capita income for the town was $32,301.  About 3.3% of families and 4.1% of the population were below the poverty line, including 3.9% of those under the age of 18 and 4.0% of those 65 and older.

Principal communities in Branford

Branford Center

Branford Center is home to many small stores, restaurants, and coffee houses, which line Main Street, with the Green at the center. The Branford Green has churches as well as the town hall and other government facilities and hosts concerts and other events, such as the annual Branford Festival.  Traditionally, the graduating class from Branford High School graduates in front of the Town Hall, weather permitting.

Branford Hills

Branford Hills sits on the western end of town and centers on the heavily commercialized strip of U.S. Route 1. Fast-food and sit-down restaurants, auto dealers, grocery stores, and several strip malls are located there. The more southern section features less dense areas with woodlands and farm featuring trails that the Branford Land Trust preserves that connect the Shoreline Greenway trail from New Haven to Madison. The northern section also features a less dense area with woodlands that surround Lake Saltonstall which also feature trail systems maintained by the Regional Water Authority, as the Lake is a reservoir for Branford.

Branford Hills features many condominium and apartment complexes. The original site of Connecticut Hospice (now the Monastery of the Glorious Cross—a semi-cloistered community of Benedictine nuns) is located in this area, on Burban Drive.  Also on Burban Drive is St. Elizabeth of Hungary Roman Catholic Church, which was originally located in Short Beach.

Indian Neck

Indian Neck is in the south-central section of Branford, dominated by a peninsula bordering Branford Harbor. Both Foote Park and John B. Sliney Memorial Park are located within Indian Neck.

Back in the early to mid 20th century Indian Neck was a tourist destination.  Trolley service came down to Sybil and Limewood avenues, which had its own commercial area.  These included Harry's General Store, Bud's Bait Box, and on Limewood Ave the Waverly Inn, Madelyn's Restaurant, Surfside Restaurant, a news, comics, candy, variety store named Lounsberry's, and Dairy Joy Ice Cream.  Much of the area contained second homes, so the beach was an active place.  As the area became more year-round the commercial business slowly shut down.  The Montasco Inn, owned/operated for many years by the Poirot's was torn down in the 1960's. The landmark Waverly Inn burned to the ground in the early 1970s truly marking the end of an era.

Indian Neck – Pine Orchard Volunteer Fire Company 9 is located here.

In February 2015, Stony Creek Brewery, named after the Stony Creek area of Branford, opened its doors here.

Pine Orchard
Pine Orchard is situated between Indian Neck and Stony Creek. The Pine Orchard Yacht and Country Club (P.O.Y.C.C.), the Pine Brook School (formerly Wightwood School), a private institution, and Francis Walsh Intermediate School are found here.   Notable residents include Dr. Nicholas Perricone and Edward M. Kennedy, Jr.

Stony Creek

Stony Creek is a shore front neighborhood in the southeastern section of Branford, centered on a harbor on Long Island Sound. An eclectic community, Stony Creek has the ambiance of a small seaside village with a blend of various architectural style buildings and a few small retail establishments, sandwich shops, galleries and antique shop Stony Creek Depot

Just offshore from Stony Creek is an intriguing archipelago of islands known as the Thimble Islands. The Thimbles are a jumble of glacial rocks, ranging from  down to stepping-stone size, at the mouth of the harbor. Despite their small size, they possess a wealth of history and local lore, as well as providing pleasant scenery for a summer cruise.

Stony Creek is home to the all-male Stony Creek Fife & Drum Corps, and the only all-female fife and drum corps, Totoket Ancient Fife & Drum Corps. A large quarry is still working and supplied the distinctive pink/orange Stony Creek granite for the Brooklyn Bridge (Although this contradicts linked page "The granite blocks were quarried and shaped on Vinalhaven Island, Maine, under a contract with the Bodwell Granite Company, and delivered from Maine to New York by schooner. ), the base of the Statue of Liberty, and the newest House Office Building in Washington, D.C. Granite from Stony Creek was chosen to be used in New York City's Statue of Liberty museum, which opened in May 2019.

Stony Creek Fire and Rescue Company 5 is located here.

Short Beach

Short Beach is a beach neighborhood in the western end of town, south of Branford Hills. It is home to many small private islands, the largest being Kelsey Island, which has a handful of small cabins used as summer homes. There is no public access (except for public tidal zones) to Kelsey Island and trespassing is not allowed. Short Beach is home to half of the famous Shore Line Trolley Museum, which is also in neighboring East Haven. Also in Short Beach are the Yale Corinthian Yacht Club (YCYC), Short Beach Union Church and three parks, the largest being Pardee Park. Short Beach's population is about 1,500 and features a three-day festival at the end of summer called Short Beach Days. Short Beach is known for the population of monk parakeets that live there (referred to as the "Short Beach Parrots"), a non-native bird.

Short Beach Hose, Hook and Ladder Company 4, founded in 1911, is located here.

Hotchkiss Grove

Hotchkiss Grove of Branford is located between Indian Neck and Pine Orchard and consists of First through Ninth avenues, as well as parts of Hotchkiss Grove Road, Seaview Avenue, and Dudley Avenue. It has a small beach used for swimming and mooring boats and features a raft to swim out to. Bay Point Park (The Point) is a grassy peninsula going out into the water where there used to be a small pier. Occasionally residents of Hotchkiss Grove can rent the Point to host parties. Every first Saturday of August, Hotchkiss Grove Day is held, with the day starting with a costume parade, games, and prizes. In the afternoon there are beach games in which kids compete with one another on the beach, a clam bar, and live music. Dinner, a raffle, auction, and dancing close out the evening. Historically Hotchkiss Grove was a summer community with beach cottages and dirt roads; over the past two decades most of the cottages have been converted into permanent, year round residences.

Other communities
Other minor communities and geographic features in the town are Branford Point, Brocketts Point, Brushy Plain, Cherry Hill, Clam Island, Double Beach, Goodsell Point, Granite Bay, Haycock Point, High Island, Jepson Island, Johnson's Point, Kidd's Island, Killam's Point, Lanphier Cove, Little Pumpkin, Money Island, Pawson Park, Potato Island, Rockland Park, Sagamore Cove, Scotch Cap, Sumac Island, Summer Island, Sunset Beach, Thimble Islands, Todd's Hill, Vedder's Point, and Wheeler Island.

Industry 
Now that Malleable Iron Fittings has been largely demolished and the site turned into housing, Branford is known for high-technology and pharmaceutical companies such as 454 Life Sciences and Durata Therapeutics, a pharmaceutical company focused on the development and commercialization of differentiated therapeutic solutions for physicians and providers to advance patient care in infectious disease and acute illnesses. Also with offices and manufacturing space in Branford is American Polyfilm, Inc., which specializes in the manufacture of polyurethane film for a number of industries including industrial and high performance fabrics and medical products to name a few. Wilson Arms is in Branford, a company that produces small-caliber rifles and parts. Branford is currently home to three privately owned beer breweries: Stony Creek Brewery, Thimble Island Brewing Co, and Duvig Brewing Company. Within the town are also two large glazing and window construction companies, Massey's Plate Glass & Aluminum and Cherry Hill Glass.
Branford is also home to Autac, Inc. which has been manufacturing high quality coiled cords since 1947.

Education 
Schools in Branford:
Branford High School
Francis Walsh Intermediate School
John B. Sliney School
Linda Chipkin School
Mary R. Tisko School
Mary T. Murphy School
East Shoreline Catholic Academy

Transportation 
The main artery through the town is Interstate 95, running along the eastern coast of the United States. The town has a station on the Shore Line East commuter rail line from New London to New Haven.

The Branford Steam Railroad carries quarried trap rock from North Branford to barges at Juniper Point near Stony Creek.

Major roads

 West Main Street/North Main Street/East Main Street (U.S. Route 1) – parallels I-95. Main Street passes through the town center.
 Connecticut Route 142 (Short Beach Road/Shore Drive) serves the community of Short Beach in the southwestern part of the town.
 Connecticut Route 146 is a scenic route that passes through various coastal communities in the southeastern part of the town and into Guilford. The route runs closely parallel to the Amtrak/Shore Line East railroad tracks.
 Cedar Street/Brushy Plain Road runs from Main Street into North Branford. The section north of Route 1 is an unsigned state road (SR 740). A large number of condominium complexes are located on SR 740 or one of its side roads. Mary T. Murphy Elementary School, Veterans Memorial Park and Lidyhites Pond are also located on the section known as Brushy Plain Road. The road takes a winding route over a hill popularly known as "Snake Hill", site of numerous traffic accidents, as it heads north into North Branford.

Culture 

One of the largest events in Branford every year is the Branford Festival on Father's Day weekend, which features food, crafts, children's rides, music and a  road race.

A book sale is held annually each autumn on the Branford Green to raise money for the town library.

Notable people

 Jacob M. Appel, novelist and bioethicist
 Bob Barthelson, major league baseball player
 King Donovan (1918–1987), actor
 Skylar Dunn, American actress
 Bob DuPuy, president and chief operating officer of Major League Baseball (MLB)
 Selma Engel-Wijnberg (1922–2018), Holocaust survivor
 Todd English, celebrity chef 
 Ron Glick, soccer player
 Levi Jackson, first African American captain of an Ivy League Football team during time at Yale
 Edward Kennedy, Jr. (Ted), State Senator, son of United States Senator Ted Kennedy
 Henry Lee, forensic scientist
 Herman Lubinsky, owner of Savoy Records
 Henry Ludington, father of American Revolutionary War figure Sybil Ludington
 Beauty McGowan, MLB baseball player
 Norodom Yuvaneath, first born son of Norodom Sihanouk of Cambodia
 Mike Olt, MLB baseball player 
 Henry Bradley Plant, railroad magnate
 Ollie Sax, MLB baseball player
 Joseph Stamler (1911–1988), New Jersey Superior Court judge and professor at Rutgers University
 Thomas Steitz, 2009 Nobel laureate in chemistry
 Beverly Willis, pioneering American architect and designer of the San Francisco Ballet Building

Sister cities 
 Brentford, England

References

External links

Government 
Town of Branford official web site
Town of Branford Police Department
Town of Branford Fire Department

Other 
Branford Chamber of Commerce
Branford Historical Society
Connecticut Hospice, first hospice in the United States
Branford Festival
James Blackstone Memorial Library
Stony Creek Museum

 
Towns in New Haven County, Connecticut
Towns in the New York metropolitan area
Towns in Connecticut
Populated coastal places in Connecticut
1644 establishments in Connecticut
Populated places established in 1644